Argalista micans is a species of small sea snail with calcareous opercula, a marine gastropod mollusk in the family Colloniidae.

Distribution
This marine species is endemic to New Zealand.

References

External links
 To World Register of Marine Species

Colloniidae
Gastropods described in 1931